William Stokes may refer to:

Politicians
 William Stokes (MP) for Leominster (UK Parliament constituency) in 1421
 William Brickly Stokes (1814–1897), American soldier and politician
 J. William Stokes (1853–1901), U.S. Representative from South Carolina
 William R. Stokes, American politician and mayor of Augusta, Maine

Doctors
 William Stokes (physician) (1804–1878), Irish physician
 Sir William Stokes (surgeon) (1839–1900), his son
 William Royal Stokes (1870–1930), American physician and bacteriologist

Others
 William Axton Stokes (1814–1877), Philadelphia attorney and Major in the American Civil War
 William Earl Dodge Stokes (1852–1926), American property developer
 William Stokes (Victoria cricketer) (1857-1929), Australian cricketer
 William Stokes (Western Australia cricketer) (1886-1954), Australian cricketer
 William Lee Stokes (1915-1994, known as the "Father of Utah geology"), American geologist and paleontologist
 William H. Stokes (born 1957), American bishop
 William James Stokes, musician better known by stage name Sir The Baptist

See also
Willie Stokes (disambiguation)